Kim Bong-Soo (Hangul: 김봉수, born December 4, 1970) is a South Korean former footballer and football coach.

Club career 
Kim Bong-soo played for FC Seoul then known as LG Cheetahs and Anyang LG Cheetahs, Ulsan Hyundai Horang-i and Chunnam Dragons. Kim was a member of South Korea of 1998 FIFA World Cup qualification.

International career

Career statistics

Club

International clean sheets
Results list South Korea's goal tally first.

References

External links
 
 Kim Bong-so – National Team stats at KFA 
 
 

1970 births
Living people
Association football goalkeepers
South Korean footballers
South Korea international footballers
FC Seoul players
Ulsan Hyundai FC players
K League 1 players
1988 AFC Asian Cup players
Footballers at the 1992 Summer Olympics
1996 AFC Asian Cup players
Olympic footballers of South Korea
People from Gunsan